Tin selenide, also known as stannous selenide, is an inorganic compound with the formula SnSe. Tin(II) selenide is a typical layered metal chalcogenide as it includes a group 16 anion (Se2−) and an electropositive element (Sn2+), and is arranged in a layered structure. Tin(II) selenide is a narrow band-gap (IV-VI) semiconductor structurally analogous to black phosphorus. It has received considerable interest for applications including low-cost photovoltaics, and memory-switching devices. 

Because of its low thermal conductivity as well as reasonable electrical conductivity, tin selenide is one of the most efficient thermoelectric materials.

Structure 

Tin(II) selenide (SnSe) crystallizes in the orthorhombic structure that derives from a distorted rock-salt structure. It is isomorphous to germanium selenide (GeSe). The unit cell encompasses two inverted layers. Each tin atom is covalently bonded to three neighboring selenium atoms, and each selenium atom is covalently bonded to three neighboring tin atoms.  The layers are held together primarily by van der Waals forces. At temperatures above 800 K its structure changes to rock-salt structure.
 
At pressures above 58 GPa, SnSe acts as a superconductor; this change of conductivity is likely due to a change in the structure to that of CsCl. 
In recent years, it has become evident that new polymorphs of SnSe exists based upon the cubic and orthorhombic crystal systems, known as π-SnSe (space group: P213, No. 198) and γ-SnSe (space group: Pnma, No. 62)

Synthesis 
Tin(II) selenide can be formed by reacting the elements tin and selenium above 350 °C.

Problems with the composition are encountered during synthesis. Two phases exist—the hexagonal SnSe2 phase and the orthorhombic SnSe phase. Specific nanostructures can be synthesized, but few 2D nanostructures have been prepared. Both square SnSe nanostructures and single-layer SnSe nanostructures have been prepared. Historically, phase-controlled synthesis of 2D tin selenide nanostructures is quite difficult.

Sheet-like nanocrystalline SnSe with an orthorhombic phase has been prepared with good purity and crystallization via a reaction between a selenium alkaline aqueous solution and tin(II) complex at room temperature under atmospheric pressure.
A few-atom-thick SnSe nanowires can be grown inside narrow (~1 nm diameter) single-wall carbon nanotubes by heating the nanotubes with SnSe powder in vacuum at 960 °C. Contrary to the bulk SnSe, they have the cubic crystal structure.

Chemistry 
Tin(II) selenide adopts a layered orthorhombic crystal structure at room temperature, which can be derived from a three-dimensional distortion of the NaCl structure. There are two-atom-thick SnSe slabs (along the b–c plane) with strong Sn–Se bonding within the plane of the slabs, which are then linked with weaker Sn–Se bonding along the a direction. The structure contains highly distorted SnSe7 coordination polyhedra, which have three short and four very long Sn–Se bonds, and a lone pair of the Sn2+ sterically accommodated between the four long Sn–Se bonds. The two-atom-thick SnSe slabs are corrugated, creating a zig-zag accordion-like projection along the b axis. The easy cleavage in this system is along the (100) planes. While cooling from its high-temperature, higher symmetry phase (space group Cmcm, #63), SnSe undergoes a displacive (shear) phase transition at ~750–800 K, resulting in a lower symmetry Pnma (#62) space group. Owing to this layered, zig-zag accordion-like structure, SnSe demonstrates low anharmonicity and an intrinsically ultralow lattice thermal conductivity, making SnSe one of the world’s least thermally conductive crystalline materials. The fundamental mechanism of the low thermal conductivity has been elaborated in this “soft” accordion-like layered structure and verified due to a abnormally strong phonon renormalization at room temperature.

Use in energy harvesting 
Tin(II) selenide may be soon used in energy harvesting. Tin(II) selenide has demonstrated the ability to convert waste heat into electrical energy. SnSe has exhibited the highest thermoelectric material efficiency, measured by the unitless ZT parameter, of any known material (~2.62 at 923 K along the b axis and ~2.3 along the c axis). When coupled with the Carnot efficiency for heat conversion, the overall energy conversion efficiency of approximately 25%. In order for this thermoelectric process to work, a thermoelectric generator must take advantage of the temperature difference experienced by two legs of a thermocouple junction. Each leg is composed of a specific material that is optimized at the operating temperature range of interest. SnSe would serve as the p-type semiconductor leg. Such a material needs to have low total thermal conductivity, high electrical conductivity, and high Seebeck coefficient according to the thermoelectric figure of merit ZT. Even though the record-high efficiency is most likely due to low thermal conductivity of the crystal, the electronic structure may have as important role: SnSe has highly anisotropic valence band structure, which consists of multiple valleys that act as independent channels for very mobile, low effective-mass charge transport within, and heavy-carrier conductivity perpendicular to the layers. While, historically, lead telluride and silicon-germanium have been used, these materials have suffered from heat conduction through the material. 

At room temperature, the crystal structure of SnSe is Pnma. However, at ~750 K, it undergoes a phase transition that results in a higher symmetry Cmcm structure. This phase transition preserves many of the advantageous transport properties of SnSe. The dynamic structural behavior of SnSe involving the reversible phase transition helps to preserve the high power factor. The Cmcm phase, which is structurally related to the low temperature Pnma phase, exhibits a substantially reduced energy gap and enhanced carrier mobilities while maintaining the ultralow thermal conductivity thus yielding the record ZT. Because of SnSe’s layered structure, which does not conduct heat well, one end of the SnSe single crystal can get hot while the other remains cool. This idea can be paralleled with the idea of a posture-pedic mattress that does not transfer vibrations laterally. In SnSe, the ability of crystal vibrations (also known as phonons) to propagate through the material is significantly hampered. This means heat can only travel due to hot carriers (an effect that can be approximated by the Wiedemann–Franz law), a heat transport mechanism that is much less significant to the total thermal conductivity. Thus the hot end can stay hot while the cold end remains cold, maintaining the temperature gradient needed for thermoelectric device operation. The poor ability to carry heat through its lattice enables the resulting record high thermoelectric conversion efficiency. The previously reported nanostructured all-scale hierarchical PbTe-4SrTe-2Na (with a ZT of 2.2) exhibits a lattice thermal conductivity of 0.5 W m−1 K−1. The unprecedentedly high ZT ~2.6 of SnSe arises primarily from an even lower lattice thermal conductivity of 0.23 W m−1 K−1. However, in order to take advantage of this ultralow lattice thermal conductivity, the synthesis method must result in macroscale single crystals as p-type polycrystalline SnSe has been shown to have a significantly reduced ZT. Enhancement in the figure of merit above a relatively high value of 2.5 can have sweeping ramifications for commercial applications especially for materials using less expensive, more Earth-abundant elements that are devoid of lead and tellurium (two materials that have been prevalent in the thermoelectric materials industry for the past couple decades).

Other uses 
Tin selenides may be used for optoelectronic devices, solar cells, memory switching devices, and anodes for lithium-ion batteries.

Tin(II) selenide has an additional use as a solid-state lubricant, due to the nature of its interlayer bonding. However, it is not the most stable of the chalcogenide solid-state lubricants, as tungsten diselenide has much weaker interplanar bonding, is highly chemically inert and has high stability in high-temperature, high-vacuum environments.

References 

Selenides
Tin(II) compounds